Ludivine Loiseau (born 27 August 1980) is a former French Paralympic swimmer who has competed in three Paralympic Games and has won twelve medals. She was born with a short arm and leg on her right hand side. Loiseau was awarded the Legion of Honor by Jacques Chirac for her medal success in both Paralympic and world championship events.

References

1980 births
Living people
Sportspeople from Lyon
Paralympic swimmers of France
Swimmers at the 1996 Summer Paralympics
Swimmers at the 2000 Summer Paralympics
Swimmers at the 2004 Summer Paralympics
Medalists at the 1996 Summer Paralympics
Medalists at the 2000 Summer Paralympics
Medalists at the 2004 Summer Paralympics
Paralympic medalists in swimming
Paralympic gold medalists for France
Paralympic silver medalists for France
Paralympic bronze medalists for France
French female freestyle swimmers
French female backstroke swimmers
S6-classified Paralympic swimmers
Medalists at the World Para Swimming Championships
21st-century French women
20th-century French women